The 1960 Wightman Cup was the 32nd edition of the annual women's team tennis competition between the United States and Great Britain. It was held at the All England Lawn Tennis and Croquet Club in London in England in the United Kingdom.

References

1950
1960 in tennis
1960 in American tennis
1960 in British sport
1960 in women's tennis
1960 sports events in London
1960 in English tennis
1960 in English women's sport